Maskrey is a surname. Notable people with the surname include:

Harry Maskrey (1880–1927), English footballer
Harry Maskrey (baseball) (1861–1930), American baseball player
Leech Maskrey (1854–1922), American baseball player
Steve Maskrey (born 1962), Scottish footballer

See also
Maskey